The British Rail Class 123 was a design of diesel multiple unit built for British Rail in 1963. They were the last first-generation DMUs built for British Railways and were built at Swindon Works, designed like all Swindon units as inter-city sets. Ten of the four-car sets were built and introduced in 1963. The units bear a visible similarity to the British Rail Class 309; however, there is no 'relation' here as the two types were built by different manufacturers for different markets.

Details
Swindon-built DMUs, including the Class 123 and 124, had a structure and internal construction with much more in common with BR coaching stock (British Rail Mark 1) than they do with many DMU classes. The carriage underframes were longer (Mk1 standard main-line  frames versus the  frames common to most 1st generation DMUs) and the units were provided with mark 1-style 'Pullman' gangways instead of the 'British Standard Gangways' fitted to most contemporary DMUs of the period. It was also unusual for a first-generation DMU to sport a front-end gangway. None of these units survive today.

Operational history

They were originally intended for use on services from the South Coast to Wales, but only briefly used on services from Portsmouth to Cardiff and Bristol. When introduced they were concentrated on services between  Swansea, Cardiff, Birmingham, Derby and Crewe and between Cardiff and Bristol. While still in their original green livery the units were trialled on services between Plymouth and Penzance on the Cornish Main Line as an alternative to loco-hauled services.

They were displaced in 1970 to outer suburban services from London Paddington to Oxford and Newbury, without the buffet cars.

All were stored in April 1977 but reprieved later that year for services from Hull to Doncaster, Sheffield, Manchester and occasionally to Leeds. All were withdrawn in 1984 and stored at Hull Botanic Gardens TMD.

Nine 2-car sets composed of a class 123 DMBSL and class 124 DMC were formed at Hull in 1984 in case introduction of the class 141 'Pacer' units was delayed, but they were never used in service.

Further use
One of the buffet cars, 59831, was rebuilt as a Class 309 AC EMU griddle car and renumbered 69108. It replaced a griddle car that had developed an underframe fault. Buffet car 59828 was converted to departmental dormitory coach in 1970 and used on the rail profiler train, then converted to a stores coach and used until 1987.

After withdrawal, the Leyland Albion engines were removed and used as spares for the class 115 DMU.

References

Sources

Motive Power Recognition: 3 DMUs. Colin J. Marsden
British Rail Fleet Survey 8: Diesel Multiple Units- The First Generation.  Brian Haresnape

Further reading

External links

History of the Class 123s

123
Train-related introductions in 1963